Kashgar or Kashi is an oasis city in the Tarim Basin region of Southern Xinjiang. It is one of the westernmost cities of China, near the border with Afghanistan, Kyrgyzstan, Tajikistan and Pakistan. With a population of over 500,000, Kashgar has served as a trading post and strategically important city on the Silk Road between China, the Middle East and Europe for over 2,000 years, making it one of the oldest continuously inhabited cities in the World.

At the convergence point of widely varying cultures and empires, Kashgar has been under the rule of the Chinese, Turkic, Mongol and Tibetan empires. The city has also been the site of a number of battles between various groups of people on the steppes.

The city was made into a Special Economic Zone in 2010, the only city in western China with this distinction. Kashgar also forms a terminus of the Karakoram Highway, the reconstruction of which is considered a major part of the multibillion-dollar China–Pakistan Economic Corridor.

Name
Ptolemy (AD 90–168), in his Geography, Chapter 15.3A, refers to Kashgar as “Kasi”. Its western and probably indigenous name is the Kāš ("rock"), to which the East Iranian -γar ("mountain") and Middle Persian gar/ġar, from Old Persian/Pahlavi girīwa ("hill; ridge (of a mountain)") was attached. Alternative historical Romanizations for "Kashgar" include Cascar
and Cashgar.

Other names for the city, such as the old Chinese name Shule  and Tibetan Śu-lig may have originated as an attempts to transcribe the Sanskrit name for Kashgar, Śrīkrīrāti ("fortunate hospitality").

Transliterations of the official Uyghur  include: K̂äxk̂är (SASM/GNC strict) or Kaxkar (SASM/GNC broad). Transliterations of the other Uyghur name  include: Kaxĝär (SASM/GNC strict) or Kaxgar (SASM/GNC broad).

History 

Kashgar is located at the convergence point of widely varying cultures and empires, it has been under the rule of the historically Chinese, Turkic, Mongol, and Tibetan empires. The city has also been the site of a number of battles between various groups of people on the steppes.

Han dynasty 

The earliest mention of Kashgar occurs when a Chinese Han dynasty envoy traveled the Northern Silk Road to explore lands to the west.

Another early mention of Kashgar is during the Former Han (also known as the Western Han dynasty), when in 76 BCE the Chinese conquered the Xiongnu, Yutian (Khotan), Sulei (Kashgar) and a group of states in the Tarim Basin almost up to the foot of the Tian Shan range.

Ptolemy speaks of Scythia beyond the Imaus, which is in a “Kasia Regio”, probably exhibiting the name from which Kashgar and Kashgaria (often applied to the district) are formed. The country's people practised Zoroastrianism and Buddhism before the coming of Islam.

In the Book of Han, which covers the period between 125 BCE and 23 CE, it is recorded that there were 1,510 households, 18,647 people and 2,000 persons able to bear arms. By the time covered by the Book of the Later Han (roughly 25 to 170 CE), it had grown to 21,000 households and had 3,000 men able to bear arms.

The Book of the Later Han provides a wealth of detail on developments in the region:

More particularly, in reference to Kashgar itself, is the following record:

The Kushans 

The Book of the Later Han also gives the only extant historical record of Yuezhi or Kushan involvement in the Kashgar oasis:

However, it was not very long before the Chinese began to reassert their authority in the region:

From an earlier part of the same text comes the following addition:

The first passage continues:

Three Kingdoms to the Sui dynasty 
These centuries are marked by a general silence in sources on Kashgar and the Tarim Basin.

The Weilüe, composed in the second third of the 3rd century, mentions a number of states as dependencies of Kashgar: the kingdom of Zhenzhong (Arach?), the kingdom of Suoju (Yarkand), the kingdom of Jieshi, the kingdom of Qusha, the kingdom of Xiye (Khargalik), the kingdom of Yinai (Tashkurghan), the kingdom of Manli (modern Karasul), the kingdom of Yire (Mazar − also known as Tágh Nák and Tokanak), the kingdom of Yuling, the kingdom of Juandu (‘Tax Control’ − near modern Irkeshtam), the kingdom of Xiuxiu (‘Excellent Rest Stop’ − near Karakavak), and the kingdom of Qin.

However, much of the information on the Western Regions contained in the Weilüe seems to have ended roughly about (170), near the end of Han power. So, we cannot be sure that this is a reference to the state of affairs during the Cao Wei (220–265), or whether it refers to the situation before the civil war during the Later Han when China lost touch with most foreign countries and came to be divided into three separate kingdoms.

Chapter 30 of the Records of the Three Kingdoms says that after the beginning of the Wei Dynasty (220) the states of the Western Regions did not arrive as before, except for the larger ones such as Kucha, Khotan, Kangju, Wusun, Kashgar, Yuezhi, Shanshan and Turpan, who are said to have come to present tribute every year, as in Han times.

In 270, four states from the Western Regions were said to have presented tribute: Karashahr, Turpan, Shanshan, and Kucha. Some wooden documents from Niya seem to indicate that contacts were also maintained with Kashgar and Khotan around this time.

In 422, according to the Songshu, ch. 98, the king of Shanshan, Bilong, came to the court and "the thirty-six states in the Western Regions" all swore their allegiance and presented tribute. It must be assumed that these 36 states included Kashgar.

The "Songji" of the Zizhi Tongjian records that in the 5th month of 435, nine states: Kucha, Kashgar, Wusun, Yueban, Tashkurghan, Shanshan, Karashahr, Turpan and Sute all came to the Wei court.

In 439, according to the Weishu, ch. 4A, Shanshan, Kashgar and Karashahr sent envoys to present tribute.

According to the Weishu, ch. 102, Chapter on the Western Regions, the kingdoms of Kucha, Kashgar, Wusun, Yueban, Tashkurghan, Shanshan, Karashahr, Turpan and Sute all began sending envoys to present tribute in the Taiyuan reign period (435–440).

In 453 Kashgar sent envoys to present tribute (Weishu, ch. 5), and again in 455.

An embassy sent during the reign of Wencheng Di (452–466) from the king of Kashgar presented a supposed sacred relic of the Buddha; a dress which was incombustible.

In 507 Kashgar, is said to have sent envoys in both the 9th and 10th months (Weishu, ch. 8).

In 512, Kashgar sent envoys in the 1st and 5th months. (Weishu, ch. 8).

Early in the 6th century Kashgar is included among the many territories controlled by the Yeda or Hephthalite Huns, but their empire collapsed at the onslaught of the Western Turks between 563 and 567 who then probably gained control over Kashgar and most of the states in the Tarim Basin.

Tang dynasty

The founding of the Tang dynasty in 618 saw the beginning of a prolonged struggle between China and the Western Turks for control of the Tarim Basin. In 635, the Tang Annals reported an emissary from the king of Kashgar to the Tang capital. In 639 there was a second emissary bringing products of Kashgar as a token of submission to the Tang state.

Buddhist scholar Xuanzang passed through Kashgar (which he referred to as Ka-sha) in 644 on his return journey from India to China. The Buddhist religion, then beginning to decay in India, was active in Kashgar. Xuanzang recorded that they flattened their babies heads, tattooed their bodies and had green eyes. He reported that Kashgar had abundant crops, fruits and flowers, wove fine woolen stuffs and rugs. Their writing system had been adapted from Indian script but their language was different from that of other countries. The inhabitants were sincere Buddhist adherents and there were some hundreds of monasteries with more than 10,000 followers, all members of the Sarvastivadin School.

At around the same era, Nestorian Christians were establishing bishoprics at Herat, Merv and Samarkand, whence they subsequently proceeded to Kashgar, and finally to China proper itself.

In 646, the Turkic Kagan asked for the hand of a Tang Chinese princess, and in return the Emperor promised Kucha, Khotan, Kashgar, Karashahr and Sarikol as a marriage gift, but this did not happen as planned.

In a series of campaigns between 652 and 658, with the help of the Uyghurs, the Chinese finally defeated the Western Turk tribes and took control of all their domains, including the Tarim Basin kingdoms. Karakhoja was annexed in 640, Karashahr during campaigns in 644 and 648, and Kucha fell in 648.

In 662 a rebellion broke out in the Western Regions and a Chinese army sent to control it was defeated by the Tibetans south of Kashgar.

After another defeat of the Tang Chinese forces in 670, the Tibetans gained control of the whole region and completely subjugated Kashgar in 676-8 and retained possession of it until 692, when the Tang dynasty regained control of all their former territories, and retained it for the next fifty years.

In 722 Kashgar sent 4,000 troops to assist the Chinese to force the "Tibetans out of "Little Bolu" or Gilgit.

In 728, the king of Kashgar was awarded a brevet by the Chinese emperor.

In 739, the Tangshu relates that the governor of the Chinese garrison in Kashgar, with the help of Ferghana, was interfering in the affairs of the Turgesh tribes as far as Talas.

In 751 the Chinese were defeated by an Arab army in the Battle of Talas. The An Lushan Rebellion led to the decline of Tang influence in Central Asia due to the fact that the Tang dynasty was forced to withdraw its troops from the region to fight An Lushan. The Tibetans cut all communication between China and the West in 766.

Soon after the Chinese pilgrim monk Wukong passed through Kashgar in 753. He again reached Kashgar on his return trip from India in 786 and mentions a Chinese deputy governor as well as the local king.

Battles with Arab Caliphate

In 711, the Arabs invaded Kashgar. It is alleged that Qutayba ibn Muslim in 712-715 had conquered Xinjiang. Although the Muslim religion from the very commencement sustained checks, it nevertheless made its weight felt upon the independent states of Turkestan to the north and east, and thus acquired a steadily growing influence.   It was not, however, till the 10th century that Islam was established at Kashgar, under the Kara-Khanid Khanate.

The fall of Kashgar to Qutayba ibn Muslim is claimed as the start of Islam in the region by Al-Qaeda ideologue Mustafa Setmariam Nasar and by an article from Al-Qaeda branch Al-Nusra Front's English language "Al-Risalah magazine", second issue, translated from English into Turkish by the "Doğu Türkistan Haber Ajansı" (East Turkestan News Agency) and titled Al Risale: "Türkistan Dağları" 1. Bölüm (The Message : "Turkistan Mountains" Part 2.)

The Turkic Rule
According to the 10th-century text, Hudud al-'alam, "the chiefs of Kashghar in the days of old were from the Qarluq, or from the Yaghma."  The Karluks, Yaghmas and other tribes such as the Chigils formed the Karakhanids. The Karakhanid Sultan Satuq Bughra Khan converted to Islam in the 10th century and captured Kashgar.  Kashgar was the capital of the Karakhanid state for a time but later the capital was moved to Balasaghun. During the latter part of the 10th century, the Muslim Karakhanids began a struggle against the Buddhist Kingdom of Khotan, and the Khotanese defeated the Karakhanids and captured Kashgar in 970. Chinese sources recorded the king of Khotan offering to send them a dancing elephant captured from Kashgar.  Later in 1006, the Karakhanids of Kashgar under Yusuf Kadr Khan conquered Khotan.

The Karakhanid Khanate however was beset with internal strife, and the khanate split into two, the Eastern and Western Karakhanid Khanates, with Kashgar falling within the domain of the Eastern Karakhanid state.  In 1089, the Western Karakhanids fell under the control of the Seljuks, but the Eastern Karakhanids was for the most part independent.

Both the Karakhanid states were defeated in the 12th century by the Kara-Khitans who captured Balasaghun, however Karakhanid rule continued in Kashgar under the suzerainty of the Kara-Khitans. The Kara-Khitan rulers followed a policy of religious tolerance, Islamic religious life continued uninterrupted and Kashgar was also a Nestorian metropolitan see. The last Karakhanid of Kashgar was killed in a revolt in 1211 by the city's notables.  Kuchlug, a usurper of the throne of the Kara-Khitans, then attacked Kashgar which finally surrendered in 1214.

Mongol’s rule 

The Kara-Khitai in their turn were swept away in 1219 by Genghis Khan. After his death, Kashgar came under the rule of the Chagatai Khans. Marco Polo visited the city, which he calls Cascar, about 1273-4 and recorded the presence of numerous Nestorian Christians, who had their own churches. Later In the 14th century, a Chagataid khan Tughluq Timur converted to Islam, and Islamic tradition began to reassert its ascendancy.

In 1389–1390 Tamerlane ravaged Kashgar, Andijan and the intervening country. Kashgar endured a troubled time, and in 1514, on the invasion of the Khan Sultan Said, was destroyed by Mirza Ababakar, who with the aid of ten thousand men built a new fort with massive defences higher up on the banks of the Tuman river. The dynasty of the Chagatai Khans collapsed in 1572 with the division of the country among rival factions; soon after, two powerful Khoja factions, the White and Black Mountaineers (Ak Taghliq or Afaqi, and Kara Taghliq or Ishaqi), arose whose differences and war-making gestures, with the intermittent episode of the Oirats of Dzungaria, make up much of recorded history in Kashgar until 1759. The Dzungar Khanate conquered Kashgar and set up the Khoja as their puppet rulers.

Qing conquest 

The Qing dynasty defeated the Dzungar Khanate during the Ten Great Campaigns and took control of Kashgar in 1759. The conquerors consolidated their authority by settling other ethnics emigrants in the vicinity of a Manchu garrison.

Rumours flew around Central Asia that the Qing planned to launch expeditions towards Transoxiana and Samarkand, the chiefs of which sought assistance from the Afghan king Ahmed Shah Abdali. The alleged expedition never happened so Ahmad Shah withdrew his forces from Kokand. He also dispatched an ambassador to Beijing to discuss the situation of the Afaqi Khojas, but the representative was not well received, and Ahmed Shah was too busy fighting off the Sikhs to attempt to enforce his demands through arms.

The Qing continued to hold Kashgar with occasional interruptions during the Afaqi Khoja revolts. One of the most serious of these occurred in 1827, when the city was taken by Jahanghir Khoja; Chang-lung, however, the Qing general of Ili, regained possession of Kashgar and the other rebellious cities in 1828.

The Kokand Khanate raided Kashgar several times. A revolt in 1829 under Mahommed Ali Khan and Yusuf, brother of Jahanghir resulted in the concession of several important trade privileges to the Muslims of the district of Altishahr (the "six cities"), as it was then called.

The area enjoyed relative calm until 1846 under the rule of Zahir-ud-din, the local Uyghur governor, but in that year a new Khoja revolt under Kath Tora led to his accession as the authoritarian ruler of the city. However, his reign was briefat the end of seventy-five days, on the approach of the Chinese, he fled back to Khokand amid the jeers of the inhabitants. The last of the Khoja revolts (1857) was of about equal duration, and took place under Wali-Khan, who murdered the well-known traveler Adolf Schlagintweit.

1862 Chinese Hui revolt 
The great Dungan revolt (1862–1877) involved insurrection among various Muslim ethnic groups. It broke out in 1862 in Gansu then spread rapidly to Dzungaria and through the line of towns in the Tarim Basin.

Dungan troops based in Yarkand rose and in August 1864 massacred some seven thousand Chinese and their Manchu commander. The inhabitants of Kashgar, rising in their turn against their masters, invoked the aid of Sadik Beg, a Kyrgyz chief, who was reinforced by Buzurg Khan, the heir of Jahanghir Khoja, and his general Yakub Beg. The latter men were dispatched at Sadik's request by the ruler of Khokand to raise what troops they could to aid his Muslim friends in Kashgar.

Sadik Beg soon repented of having asked for a Khoja, and eventually marched against Kashgar, which by this time had succumbed to Buzurg Khan and Yakub Beg, but was defeated and driven back to Khokand. Buzurg Khan delivered himself up to indolence and debauchery, but Yakub Beg, with singular energy and perseverance, made himself master of Yangi Shahr, Yangi-Hissar, Yarkand and other towns, and eventually became sole master of the country, Buzurg Khan proving himself totally unfit for the post of ruler.

With the overthrow of Chinese rule in 1865 by Yakub Beg (1820–1877), the manufacturing industries of Kashgar are supposed to have declined.

Yaqub Beg entered into relations and signed treaties with the Russian Empire and the British Empire, but when he tried to get their support against China, he failed.

Kashgar and the other cities of the Tarim Basin remained under Yakub Beg's rule until May 1877, when he died at Korla. Thereafter Kashgaria was reconquered by the forces of the Qing general Zuo Zongtang during the Qing reconquest of Xinjiang.

Qing rule

There were eras in Xinjiang's history where intermarriage was common, and "laxity" set upon Uyghur women led them to marry Chinese men in the period after Yakub Beg's rule ended. It is also believed by Uyghurs that some Uyghurs have Han Chinese ancestry from historical intermarriage, such as those living in Turpan.

Even though Muslim women are forbidden to marry non-Muslims in Islamic law, from 1880 to 1949 it was frequently violated in Xinjiang when Chinese men married Uyghur women. Because they were viewed as "outcast", Islamic cemeteries banned the Uyghur wives of Chinese men from being buried within them. Uyghur women got around this problem by giving shrines donations and buying a grave in other towns. Besides Chinese men, other men such as Hindus, Armenians, Jews, Russians, and Badakhshanis (Pamiris) intermarried with local Uyghur women. The local society accepted the Uyghur women and Chinese men's mixed offspring as their own people despite the marriages being in violation of Islamic law.

An anti-Russian uproar broke out when Russian customs officials, 3 Cossacks and a Russian courier invited local Uyghur prostitutes to a party in January 1902 in Kashgar. There was a general anti-Russian sentiment, but the inflamed local Uyghur populace started a brawl with the Russians on the pretense of protecting their women. Even though morality was not strict in Kashgar, the local population confronted with the Russians before they were dispersed by guards, and the Chinese then sought to end tensions by preventing the Russians from building up a pretext to invade.

After the riot, the Russians sent troops to Sarikol in Tashkurghan and demanded that the Sarikol postal services be placed under Russian supervision, the locals of Sarikol believed that the Russians would seize the entire district from the Chinese and send more soldiers even after the Russians tried to negotiate with the Begs of Sarikol and sway them to their side, they failed since the Sarikoli officials and authorities demanded in a petition to the Amban of Yarkand that they be evacuated to Yarkand to avoid being harassed by the Russians and objected to the Russian presence in Sarikol, the Sarikolis did not believe the Russian claim that they would leave them alone and only involved themselves in the mail service.

In 1902, a magnitude 7.7 earthquake caused up to 10,000 fatalities, including 667 in Kashgar. The earthquake was followed by a major aftershock a few days later, measuring  6.8.

Republic of China (1913–1933)

First East Turkestan Republic
Kashgar was the scene of continual battles from 1933 to 1934. Ma Shaowu, a Chinese Muslim, was the Tao-yin of Kashgar, and he fought against Uyghur rebels. He was joined by another Chinese Muslim general, Ma Zhancang.

Battle of Kashgar (1933)

Uighur and Kyrgyz forces, led by the Bughra brothers and Tawfiq Bay, attempted to take the New City of Kashgar from Chinese Muslim troops under General Ma Zhancang. They were defeated.

Tawfiq Bey, a Syrian Arab traveler, who held the title Sayyid (descendant of Muhammed) and arrived at Kashgar on 26 August 1933, was shot in the stomach by the Chinese Muslim troops in September.  Previously Ma Zhancang arranged to have the Uighur leader Timur Beg killed and beheaded on 9 August 1933, displaying his head outside of Id Kah Mosque.

Han Chinese troops commanded by Brigadier Yang were absorbed into Ma Zhancang's army. A number of Han Chinese officers were spotted wearing the green uniforms of Ma Zhancang's unit of the 36th division; presumably they had converted to Islam.

Battle of Kashgar (1934)

The 36th division General Ma Fuyuan led a Chinese Muslim army to storm Kashgar on 6 February 1934, attacking the Uighur and Kyrgyz rebels of the First East Turkestan Republic. He freed another 36th division general, Ma Zhancang, who was trapped with his Chinese Muslim and Han Chinese troops in Kashgar New City by the Uighurs and Kyrgyz since 22 May 1933.  In January 1934, Ma Zhancang's Chinese Muslim troops repulsed six Uighur attacks, launched by Khoja Niyaz, who arrived at the city on 13 January 1934, inflicting massive casualties on the Uighur forces. From 2,000 to 8,000 Uighur civilians in Kashgar Old City were massacred by Tungans in February 1934, in revenge for the Kizil massacre, after retreating of Uighur forces from the city to Yengi Hisar. The Chinese Muslim and 36th division Chief General Ma Zhongying, who arrived at Kashgar on 7 April 1934, gave a speech at Id Kah Mosque in April, reminding the Uighurs to be loyal to the Republic of China government at Nanjing. Several British citizens at the British consulate were killed or wounded by the 36th division on 16 March 1934.

Republic of China (1934–1949)

People's Republic of China

Kashgar was incorporated into the People's Republic of China in 1949. During the Cultural Revolution, one of the largest statues of Mao in China was built in Kashgar, near People's Square.

On 31 October 1981, an incident occurred in the city due to a dispute between Uyghurs and Han Chinese in which three were killed. The incident was quelled by an army unit.

In 1986, the Chinese government designated Kashgar a "city of historical and cultural significance". Kashgar and surrounding regions have been the site of Uyghur unrest since the 1990s. In 2008, two Uyghur men carried out a vehicular, IED and knife attack against police officers. In 2009, development of Kashgar's old town accelerated after the revelations of the deadly role of faulty architecture during the 2008 Sichuan earthquake. Many of the old houses in the old town were built without regulation, and as a result, officials found them to be overcrowded and non-compliant with fire and earthquake codes. Additionally, the newer buildings may also have been built with increased ease of surveillance in mind.

When the plan started, 42% of the city's residents lived in the old town. As the plan was undertaken, residents have been removed from their homes in order to demolish large sections of the old city and replace these areas with new developments. The European Parliament issued a resolution in 2011 calling for "culture-sensitive methods of renovation."  The International Scientific Committee on Earthen Architectural Heritage (ISCEAH) has expressed concern over the demolition and reconstruction of historic buildings.  ISCEAH has, additionally, urged the implementation of techniques utilized elsewhere in the world to address earthquake vulnerability.

Following the July 2009 Ürümqi riots, the government focused on local economic development in an attempt to ameliorate ethnic tensions in the greater Xinjiang region. Kashgar was made into a Special Economic Zone in 2010, the first such zone in China's far west. In 2011, a spate of violence over two days killed dozens of people. 

By May 2012, two-thirds of the old city had been demolished, which, according to critics, was done partially in order to fulfill the political goal of eroding Uighur culture. According to the Chinese government, demolition and rebuilding was necessary because the entire Kashgar area was "in a special area in danger of earthquakes." Over the last two decades, similar demolition of historic architecture followed by their replacement with "shopping malls and highways" have also been ongoing in the rest of China, often with inadequate consultation of local residents. Critics have called the destruction of the old city part of a campaign of cultural genocide. 

On 21 October 2014, Aqqash Township (Akekashi) was transferred from Konaxahar (Shufu) County to Kashgar city.

Climate
Spring is long and arrives quickly, while autumn is somewhat brief in comparison. Kashgar is one of the driest cities on the planet, averaging only  of precipitation per year. The city's wettest month, May, only sees on average  of rain. Because of the extremely arid conditions, snowfall is rare, despite the cold winters. The frost-free period averages 215 days. With monthly percent possible sunshine ranging from 50% in March to 70% in September, the city receives 2,726 hours of bright sunshine annually.

Administrative divisions
Kashgar includes eight subdistricts, two towns, and nine townships.

Subdistricts ( / )
Chasa Subdistrict (Qiasa;  / ),  Yawagh Subdistrict (Yawage;  / ),  Östeng Boyi Subdistrict (Wusitangboyi;  / ), Qum Derwaza Subdistrict (Kumudai'erwazha;  / ), Gherbiz Yurt Avenue Subdistrict (Xiyu Dadao;  / ), Sherqiy Köl Subdistrict (Donghu;  / ), Merhaba Avenue Subdistrict (Yingbin Dadao;  / ), Gherbiz Baghcha Subdistrict (Xigongyuan;  / )

Towns ( / )
Nezerbagh (Naize'er Bage;  / ; formerly ), Shamalbagh (Xiamalebage;  / ; formerly )
	
Townships ( / )
Döletbagh Township (Duolaitebage;  / ), Qoghan Township (Haohan;  / ), Semen Township (Seman;  / ), Xangdi Township (Huangdi;  / ), Beshkërem Township (Baishikeranmu;  / ), Paxtekle Township (Pahataikeli;  / ), Awat Township (Awati;  / ), Yëngi’östeng Township (Yingwusitan;  /  / ), Aqqash Township (Akekashi;  / )

Demographics

Kashgar is predominantly populated by Muslim Uyghurs. Compared to Ürümqi, Xinjiang's capital and largest city, Kashgar is less industrial and has significantly fewer Han Chinese residents. In 1998, the urban population of Kashgar was recorded as 311,141, with 81% Uyghurs and 18% Han Chinese.

In 1999, 81.24% of the population of Kashgar (Kashi) city was Uyghur and 17.87% of the population was Han Chinese.

In the 2000 census, the population of the city of Kashgar was given as 340,640. In the 2010 census, this number increased to 506,640. Some of the increase is due to boundary changes and the number may include some rural population.

In the 2015 census, 534,848 of the 628,302 residents of the county were Uyghur, 88,583 were Han Chinese and 66,131 were from other ethnic groups.

Kasghar Census 2015

Kashgar Nationality breakdown, 2018

Economy

The city has a very important Sunday market. Thousands of farmers from the surrounding fertile lands come into the city to sell a wide variety of fruit and vegetables. Kashgar's livestock market is also very lively. Silk and carpets made in Hotan are sold at bazaars, as well as local crafts, such as copper teapots and wooden jewellery boxes.

In order to boost the economy in Kashgar region, the government classified the area as the sixth Special Economic Zone of China in 2010.

The movie The Kite Runner was filmed in Kashgar. Kashgar and the surrounding countryside stood in for Kabul and Afghanistan, since filming in Afghanistan was not possible due to safety and security reasons.

Sights
Before its demolition, Kashgar's Old City had been called "the best-preserved example of a traditional Islamic city to be found anywhere in Central Asia".  It was estimated to attract more than one million tourists annually.
Id Kah Mosque, the largest mosque in China, is located in the heart of the city.
People's Park, the main public park in central Kashgar.
 The tomb of Afaq Khoja in Kashgar is considered the holiest Muslim site in Xinjiang. Abakh was a powerful ruler, controlling Khotan, Yarkand, Korla, Kucha and Aksu as well as Kashgar. Among some Uyghur Muslims, he was considered a great saint (Aulia).
 Sunday Market in Kashgar is renowned as the biggest market in central Asia; a pivotal trading point along the Silk Road where goods have been traded for more than 2,000 years. The market is open every day but Sunday is the largest.

Gallery

Transportation

Air
Kashgar Airport serves mainly domestic flights, the majority of them from Urumqi.

Rail
Kashgar has the westernmost railway station in China. It is connected to the rest of China's rail network via the Southern Xinjiang Railway, which was built in December 1999. Kashgar–Hotan Railway opened for passenger traffic in June 2011, and connected Kashgar with cities in the southern Tarim Basin including Shache (Yarkand), Yecheng (Kargilik) and Hotan.  Travel time to Urumqi from Kashgar is approximately 25 hours, while travel time to Hotan is approximately ten hours.

The investigation work of a further extension of the railway line to Pakistan has begun. In November 2009, Pakistan and China agreed to set up a joint venture to do a feasibility study of the proposed rail link via the Khunjerab Pass.

Proposals for a rail connection to Osh in Kyrgyzstan have also been discussed at various levels since at least 1996.

In 2012, a standard gauge railway from Kashgar via Tajikistan and Afghanistan to Iran and beyond was proposed.

Road
The Karakorum highway (KKH) links Islamabad, Pakistan with Kashgar over the Khunjerab Pass. The China–Pakistan Economic Corridor is a multibillion-dollar project that will upgrade transport links between China and Pakistan, including the upgrades to the Karakorum highway. Bus routes exist for passenger travel south into Pakistan. Kyrgyzstan is also accessible from Kashgar, via the Torugart Pass or the Irkeshtam Pass; as of summer 2007, daily bus service connects Kashgar with Bishkek's Western Bus Terminal. Kashgar is also located on China National Highways G314 (which runs to Khunjerab Pass on the Sino−Pakistani border, and, in the opposite direction, towards Ürümqi), and G315, which runs to Xining, Qinghai from Kashgar.

International relations

Consulates (in the past)
The British Empire had a consulate from 1890 to 1948 at Kashgar. Though a British consulate, it was staffed and funded by the Indian Political Department of British India. The consulate was not fully recognized by Qing China until 1908. It was upgraded to a consulate-general in 1911.

The wives of the inaugural consul and of the last consul left important ethnographic accounts of Kashgar, namely An English Lady in Chinese Turkestan (1931) by Lady Macartney and That Antique Land (1950) by Diana Shipton, the wife of mountaineer and consul Eric Shipton.

Twin towns – Sister cities

Kashgar is twinned with:
 Malacca City, Malaysia from February 2012
 Gilgit, Pakistan from May 2009

Notable persons
 Mahmud al-Kashgari, 11th-century scholar
 Abdurehim Heyt, Uyghur folk singer
 Nury Turkel, commissioner on the United States Commission on International Religious Freedom, one of the Time 100 Most Influential People in the World

See also
China–Pakistan Economic Corridor
 Silk Road transmission of Buddhism
 Silk Road

Notes

References

Citations

Sources 

 Boulger, Demetrius Charles The Life of Yakoob Beg, Athalik Ghazi and Badaulet, Ameer of Kashgar (London: W.H. Allen & Co.) 1878
 Gordon, T. E. 1876. The Roof of the World: Being the Narrative of a Journey over the high plateau of Tibet to the Russian Frontier and the Oxus sources on Pamir. Edinburgh. Edmonston and Douglas. Reprint: Ch’eng Wen Publishing Company. Taipei. 1971.
 Hill, John E. 2004. The Peoples of the West from the Weilüe by Yu Huan : A Third Century Chinese Account Composed between 239 and 265 CE.  Draft annotated English translation. 
 Hulsewé, A. F. P. and Loewe, M. A. N. 1979. China in Central Asia: The Early Stage 125 BC − AD 23: an annotated translation of chapters 61 and 96 of the History of the Former Han Dynasty. E. J. Brill, Leiden.
 Kim, Hodong Holy war in China. The Muslim Rebellion and State in Chinese Central Asia, 1864–1877 (Stanford University Press) 2004
 Puri, B. N. Buddhism in Central Asia, Motilal Banarsidass Publishers Private Limited, Delhi, 1987. (2000 reprint).
 Shaw, Robert. 1871. Visits to High Tartary, Yarkand and Kashgar. Reprint with introduction by Peter Hopkirk, Oxford University Press, 1984. .
 Stein, Aurel M. 1907. Ancient Khotan: Detailed report of archaeological explorations in Chinese Turkestan , 2 vols. Clarendon Press. Oxford. 
 Stein, Aurel M. 1921. Serindia: Detailed report of explorations in Central Asia and westernmost China , 5 vols. London & Oxford. Clarendon Press. Reprint: Delhi. Motilal Banarsidass. 1980. 
 Tamm, Eric Enno. The Horse That Leaps Through Clouds: A Tale of Espionage, the Silk Road and the Rise of Modern China. Vancouver: Doulgas & McIntyre, 2010. See also http://horsethatleaps.com/chapter-6/ 
 Yu, Taishan. 2004. A History of the Relationships between the Western and Eastern Han, Wei, Jin, Northern and Southern Dynasties and the Western Regions. Sino-Platonic Papers No. 131 March 2004. Dept. of East Asian Languages and Civilizations, University of Pennsylvania.

External links

 Interactive Maps and Slide Shows comparing Old and New Kashgar
 Explore Kashgar's Old Town on Global Heritage Network (GHN)
 Kashgar City government website 
 Photos of Kashgar Kashgar Pamir Youth Hostel
 Photos of Kashi dheera.net
 Kashgar berclo.net
 T. Digby, Nests of the Great Game spies Shanghai Star, 9 May 2002.
 Images and travel impressions along the Silk Road – Kashgar
 

 
Populated places along the Silk Road
Populated places in Xinjiang
Ancient peoples of China
Central Asian Buddhist kingdoms
Central Asian Buddhist sites
Former countries in Chinese history
Oases of China
Cities in Central Asia
Kashgar Prefecture
Sites along the Silk Road
Göktürks
County-level divisions of Xinjiang